A Credit Derivatives Product Company, or CDPC, is a business focused on trading in credit default swaps contracts. CDPC typically sells insurance against someone failing to pay back a loan ('defaulting'). A CDPC is usually highly leveraged, meaning that if even a portion of its held credit default portfolio were to be 'triggered' at once, the CDPC would not have the capital to fully pay out the resulting insurance claims. 

The CDPC business model is dependent on a triple-A rating from a credit rating agency and must trade within closely defined limitations to be allowed to maintain their credit rating.

History 

The first CDPC was Primus Financial Products, launched in 2002.  In October 2008 Fitch Ratings withdrew its ratings on all five CDPCs that it had previously rated, citing in part "the uncertain business prospects for CDPCs".

List of CDPCs

See also 

Monoline insurers (also dependent on a AAA rating, also sold credit default swaps)

Notes 

Investment management companies